Drayton Valley was a provincial electoral district in Alberta, Canada, mandated to return a single member to the Legislative Assembly of Alberta using the first-past-the-post method of voting from 1971 to 1993.

History
The Drayton Valley electoral district was formed from the Stony Plain, Leduc, Edson and Wetaskwin electoral districts prior to the 1930 Alberta general election. The Drayton Valley electoral district would be abolished and the Drayton Valley-Calmar electoral district would be formed in its place prior to the 1993 Alberta general election.

Members of the Legislative Assembly (MLAs)

Election results

1971 general election

1975 general election

1979 general election

1982 general election

1986 general election

1989 general election

See also
List of Alberta provincial electoral districts
Drayton Valley, a town in central Alberta

References

Further reading

External links
Elections Alberta
The Legislative Assembly of Alberta

Former provincial electoral districts of Alberta